Blistex, Incorporate is an American consumer products company headquartered in Oak Brook, Illinois. Founded in 1947, in the business of developing and marketing lip care products, its offerings have grown to include other brands including Odor-Eaters, Stridex, and Kank-A.

Description 
Blistex, Incorporated was founded in 1947 as a private, independent company in the business of developing and marketing lip care products.  It manufactures and sells a wide range of lip balm, lip ointment, and other lip-related products under the Blistex brand name. The company owns and markets additional consumer health and personal care brands including Odor-Eaters (foot care), Tucks (rectal care), Stridex (acne care), Ivarest (anti-itch ointments), Kank-A (oral pain relief), and Glysomed (moisturizing lotions).

Blistex is headquartered outside of Chicago in Oak Brook, Illinois. The company operates a production facility in Oak Brook, Illinois and is a member of the Illinois Manufacturers' Association. , Blistex products are sold around the world.

Cultural impact 

 The use of Blistex's lip care products extended into space when NASA included two tubes of Blistex in the Emergency Medical Kit during the Space Shuttle program.
 In 2021, Blistex Lip Ointment earned fourth-place honors in the "Coolest Thing Made in Illinois" contest sponsored by the Illinois Manufacturers' Association.

References

External links

 Blistex Official website

Skin care brands
Personal care brands
Manufacturing companies established in 1947
Lips
1947 establishments in Illinois
Cosmetics companies of the United States
Companies based in DuPage County, Illinois
Oak Brook, Illinois